The Arc Mouse is a family of portable computer mice produced by Microsoft. A mobile mouse, the device has evolved over a number of years, including special editions designed to coordinate with the company's Surface family of computers. All versions of the Arc Mouse are folding and include scrolling capability, and the first version was released in 2008.

Versions

Arc Mouse 
Initially release in 2008, Microsoft positioned the Arc Mouse as a fashionable, portable mouse. Available in black or red, the mouse featured a folding design. Wireless communication was provided over 2.4 GHz, and the mouse used a laser for tracking.

Arc Touch Mouse 
An updated version, the Arc Touch Mouse, changed the design and main interface points, and was released in 2010. Instead of folding for portability, the Touch Mouse flattens from its curved "in-use" shape. In place of the scroll wheel on the original, the second version features a capacitive touch strip for scrolling. The touch strip is speed sensitive, includes 3 buttons (1 each for page up and page down, and 1 programmable), and features haptic feedback.

Arc Touch Bluetooth Mouse 
To match its Surface devices, Microsoft updated the design of the Arc Touch Mouse. The new design is grey and features a new touch strip. Bluetooth is used for connectivity.

Surface Arc Mouse/Microsoft Arc Mouse 
Announced along with the Surface Laptop in 2017, the Surface Arc Mouse replaces the buttons and touch strip with a large capacitive touch surface, and it's available in colors that match the new laptop. As of December 2019, the mouse is available on the Microsoft Store for $69.99.

References 

Microsoft hardware
Computer mice